The Fifth Federal Electoral District of Chiapas (V Distrito Electoral Federal de Chiapas) is one of the 300 Electoral Districts into which Mexico is divided for the purpose of elections to the federal Chamber of Deputies and one of 12 such districts in the state of Chiapas.

It elects one deputy to the lower house of Congress for each three-year legislative period, by means of the first past the post system.

District territory
The Fifth  District is located in the Chiapas Highlands north-western portion of the state and covers the municipalities of
Amatenango del Valle, Chamula, Huixtán, Mitontic, San Cristóbal de las Casas, Tenejapa, Teopisca and Zinacantán.

The district's head town (cabecera distrital), where results from individual polling stations are gathered together and collated, is the city of San Cristóbal de las Casas.

Previous districting schemes

1996–2005 district
Between 1996 and 2005, the Fifth District of Chiapas had a slightly different configuration. It covered the following municipalities:
Chamula, Huixtan, Mitontic, San Cristóbal de las Casas, Tenejapa and Zinacantán, which are still part of its current composition, plus:
Chalchihuitán, Chenalhó, Larráinzar and Pantelhó.

Deputies returned to Congress from this district

L Legislature
1976–1979: Gonzalo Esponda Zebadúa (PRI)
LI Legislature
1979–1982: Jaime Coutiño Esquinca (PRI)
LII Legislature
1982–1985: Faustino Roos Mazo (PRI)
LIII Legislature
1985–1988:
LIV Legislature
1988–1991: César Ricardo Naumann Escobar (PRI)
LV Legislature
1991–1994:
LVI Legislature
1994–1997: Hildiberto Ochoa Samayos (PRI)
LVII Legislature
1997–2000: Gilberto Velasco Rodríguez (PRI)
LVIII Legislature
2000–2003: Nicolás Lorenzo Álvarez Martínez (PRI)
LIX Legislature
2003–2006: Florencio Collazo Gómez (PRI)
LX Legislature
2006–2009: Jorge Mario Lescieur Talavera (PRI)

References 

Federal electoral districts of Mexico
Government of Chiapas